Golem in the Gears is a fantasy novel by American writer Piers Anthony, the ninth book of the Xanth series.

Plot introduction

Grundy, a man only a few inches high, is desperate to prove himself and gain respect. He volunteers to ride the Monster Under The Bed to find his friend Ivy's long lost dragon, Stanley Steamer.

After many adventures, he rescues Rapunzel from the villainous Sea Hag. It seems too good to be true that she could become any size she wanted! A perfect match, seemingly. But that would have to wait until they shook off the pursuing Sea Hag...and Stanley still needed to be found!

Characters
Grundy
Rapunzel
Sea Hag
Snortimer

Reception
Dave Langford reviewed Golem in the Gears for White Dwarf #86, and stated that "Like some legendary D&D campaigns, Xanth is so full of whimsy and casual magic that no situation can threaten for long: the storyline lurches drunkenly from pun to banal pun."

Reviews
Review by Bob Collins (1985) in Fantasy Review, December 1985
Review by Don D'Ammassa (1986) in Science Fiction Chronicle, #82 July 1986
Review by Andy Sawyer (1987) in Paperback Inferno, #64
Review by Ken Brown (1987) in Interzone, #20 Summer 1987

References

American fantasy novels
 09
1986 American novels
Del Rey books